Miroslav Forte (born 24 October 1911, date of death unknown) was a Slovenian gymnast. He competed in eight events at the 1936 Summer Olympics.

References

External links
 

1911 births
Year of death missing
Slovenian male artistic gymnasts
Olympic gymnasts of Yugoslavia
Gymnasts at the 1936 Summer Olympics
People from Trbovlje